Ed Wright may refer to:
Ed Wright (baseball) (1919–1995), pitcher in Major League Baseball
Ed Wright (composer) (born 1980), British composer
Ed Wright (fencer) (1949–2017), American Olympic fencer
Ed Wright (politician) (1827–1895), Iowa Secretary of State
Ed Wright (sailor) (born 1977), British World Champion Sailor

See also
Edward Wright (disambiguation)
Edwin Wright (disambiguation)